The Leonardo da Vinci World Award of Arts has been established by the World Cultural Council (Mexico) to acknowledge those who offer a positive message to mankind through different expressions of art. It is conferred upon "artist, sculptor, writer, poet, cinematographer, photographer, architect, musician or other performing artist, whose work constitutes a significant contribution to the artistic legacy of the world". The award has been presented biennially since 1999.

The qualifying jury is constituted of internationally renowned artists, authorities, and members of the World Cultural Council.

The prize consists of a diploma, a commemorative medal and US$10,000.

The award is named after Leonardo da Vinci.

Award recipients

See also 

 World Cultural Council
 Albert Einstein World Award of Science
 José Vasconcelos World Award of Education
 Prizes named after people
 List of things named after Leonardo da Vinci
 Lists of art awards

References

External links 
[https://web.archive.org/web/20130318063536/http://www.consejoculturalmundial.org/awards.php Official site]

Visual arts awards
Leonardo da Vinci
Awards established in 1989